M. nigricans may refer to:
 Makaira nigricans, the Atlantic blue marlin, a fish species endemic to the Atlantic Ocean
 Mantella nigricans, the Guibé's mantella, a frog species endemic to Madagascar
 Melanogaster nigricans, a hoverfly species in the genus Melanogaster
 Melinda nigricans, a fly species in the genus Melinda
 Micropterus salmoides, the largemouth bass, a fish species found in the United States of America
 Milax nigricans, Philippi, 1836, a land slug species in the genus Milax
 Molossus nigricans, a bat species in the genus Molossus
 Myotis nigricans, the black myotis, a bat species from South and Central America
 Mucuna nigricans, a plant species in the genus Mucuna

See also
 Nigricans (disambiguation)